Chuprene is a village in northwestern Bulgaria, part of Vidin Province. It is the administrative centre of the homonymous Chuprene Municipality, which lies in the southern part of Vidin Province. The village is located 20 kilometres from Belogradchik and 70 kilometres from Vidin, 13-15 kilometres from the Bulgarian-Serbian border.

Chuprene is situated on the Manastirka and Chuprene Rivers in the western Balkan Mountains, at the foot of the Sveti Nikola Mountain and close to Midzhur, the highest peak of the western Balkan Mountains at 2,169 metres. The village is part of the copper ore vein from Bor to Chiprovtsi, and may have been settled by German ("Saxon") ore miners in the Middle Ages. The area has been inhabited since the Bronze Age and it was part of the Roman Empire in Antiquity, the First Bulgarian Empire and the Second Bulgarian Empire in medieval times. The village itself was first mentioned in an Ottoman register of the Vidin sanjak of 1454–1455. Jérôme-Adolphe Blanqui mentions it as Chupren in the description of his journey from Belogradchik to Niš in 1841. After the Liberation of Bulgaria, Chuprene grew rapidly and reached a peak population of 1800–2000.

The entire population is Christian, Bulgarian Orthodoxy being the dominant confession. Chuprene has a church with a bell and clock tower. The Chuprene Biosphere Reserve is located in the surrounding mountains.

Municipality

Chuprene municipality includes the following 9 places:

Trivia
Chuprene Glacier on Smith Island, South Shetland Islands is named after Chuprene.

Gallery

External links
 Chuprene municipality website 

Villages in Vidin Province